Voonik is an online marketplace operating in products for women's fashion. The company is based in Bengaluru, Karnataka.
 
The startup was launched as a personal mobile application, before developing a website.

Merger: 2020 February VOONIK’s B2B business was merged with Bangladesh based startup Shopup & B2C business was merged with kids activewear start up Schoolay. 

Currently Voonik operates as a DTC online brand and is headed by Kiran Hiriyanna, former voonik alumni and the Co-Founder of Schoolay.

Background
Voonik was founded in 2013 by Sujayath Ali and Navaneetha Krishnan. The company is based in Bengaluru and has 450 employees, as of June 2016. The company had raised $5 million Series A round of funding from Sequoia India in 2015 followed by Series B round $20 million and $6 million from RB Investments in 2017.

See also
 E-commerce in India
 Online shopping

References

External links
 

Fashion websites
Companies based in Bangalore
Freelance marketplace websites
2013 establishments in Karnataka
Online marketplaces of India